Industrial strength is the strength of the industry/industrial materials